Utror, also spelt Atror, is a valley located in the Swat District of Khyber Pakhtunkhwa, Pakistan. It is surrounded by snow clad mountains, green pastures and waterfalls.

Utror is surrounded by Bhan valley on the east, Upper Dir District on the west, Kalam on the south and Gabral on the north. Badogai Pass connects it to Upper Dir District.

See also
Usho
Matiltan
Gabral
Mahodand

References

Tourist attractions in Swat
Swat Kohistan
Hill stations in Pakistan